Kunsan K-8 Air Base(군산공군기지) is a United States Air Force base located at Gunsan Airport, on the west coast of the South Korean peninsula bordered by the Yellow Sea.

Kunsan Air Base is the home of the 8th Fighter Wing, "The Wolf Pack," assigned to the Pacific Air Forces Seventh Air Force and the 38th Fighter Group of the Republic of Korea Air Force. About 45 F-16 aircraft are stationed at the base. It is one of two major Air Force installations operated by the United States Forces Korea, the other being Osan Air Base.

History 

The history of Kunsan Air Base dates back to 1938, when Japanese forces occupying Korea built a base near Kunsan for fighter-interceptor aircraft.

The United States first used the base in 1945, but on a very small scale. From 1945 to 1950, the Army and later the Air Force intermittently operated small detachments from Kunsan, with these detachments maintaining liaison aircraft. At most these detachments contained a handful of people. When the United States pulled its combat units out of the Republic of Korea in 1949, it left only a Military Assistance Advisory Group in the country, and the periodic detachments at Kunsan became even more infrequent.

Korean War 
When the Korean War broke out on 25 June 1950, Kunsan Air Base had no United States flying units assigned. In their rapid advance, the invading North Koreans captured Kunsan Air Base on 13 July 1950.

The 24th Infantry Division retook Kunsan in October 1950, and the Chinese intervention that winter failed to push far enough south to put Kunsan in jeopardy. United States forces first operated in significant numbers from the base in 1951.

The first USAF unit to be assigned to the base was the 27th Fighter-Escort Wing, which arrived on 1 April 1951. The 27th Fighter Escort Wing was one of the first F-84 Thunderjet units to see combat action in Korea and earned numerous honors and awards for their combat record during the Korean War.

Improvements to the base were needed, however, to accommodate jet fighters. The 27th FEW was reassigned at the end April and the Army's 808th Engineer Aviation Battalion built a  runway to replace the sod runway constructed by Japanese. This runway was known as Taxiway Charlie (06/24). By August, construction had progressed to the point that heavier units could be based at Kusan and the USAF assigned the 3rd Bombardment Wing to Kunsan.

The 3rd Bomb Wing consisting of the 8th, 13th and 90th Bomb Squadrons flew the B-26 Invader bomber during the war, remaining at Kunsan from August 1951 until October 1954. A Marine aviation squadron, VMF(N)-513, arrived in April 1952, and a few months later the base added the 474th Fighter-Bomber Group, which included three squadrons of F-84 fighters, bringing the total size of the operation to one wing, one group, and a Marine fighter squadron. The 474th bombed and strafed such targets as bunkers, troops, artillery positions, bridges, vehicles, airfields, and power plants, and sometimes escorted bombers that attacked munitions factories and other objectives.

In April 1953, the 474th Fighter-Bomber Group returned to the United States and was replaced by the 49th Fighter-Bomber Wing, also flying the F-84.

During the Korean War, the large number of locations used for bases and the similarity of some geographical names prompted the Air Force to use alphanumeric identifiers for bases in addition to their proper designations. Under this system, each base in Korea received a "K number," simplifying positive identification when referring to the various bases. Kunsan received the number K-8, while Osan Air Base was also known as K-55.

Cold War 
After hostilities ceased, the base began to draw down. The F-84 forces of the 49th Fighter-Bomber Wing left in November 1953, and by October 1954 the host unit of the base, the 3d Bombardment Wing, also departed. This left the base with a much-reduced mission. From 1953 to 1954, the 808th and 841st Engineering Aviation Battalions constructed what is today's main runway. For the next several years Kunsan merely hosted periodic rotations of fighter and light bomber squadrons, with base facilities maintained and operated by an air base group. During 1957 and 1958 the base hosted squadrons from Japan temporarily. During 1957–8 a Republic of Korea Air Force (ROKAF) F-86 Sabre crashed into the Yellow Sea south of the base after having a flame out and a USAF F-100 Super Sabre crashed in the rice paddies north of the base. The base remained a radar site as a backup during this time to Osan, until the Radar site was turned over to the ROKAF in mid 1958. The Osan detachment on the base also maintained a radio relay site from a hill on the base. Then the base remained relatively dormant, hosting temporary deployments of flying units and serving as a safe haven base for aircraft evacuated from Okinawa and Guam during typhoons. In 1965, the ROKAF assigned a squadron of F-86 fighters to the base. This ROKAF unit was the only permanently assigned flying contingent at Kunsan until after the Pueblo incident in 1968.

At an unknown date in this time frame, the US Army 38th Air Defense Artillery Brigade assigned Battery B, 6th Battalion, 44th Air Defense Artillery Regiment, a HAWK missile unit to the base. The Tactical Operations site was located on a hill just off the coast, but near the base. Its mission was to defend the base from air attack. The HAWK site and all hardware was turned over to the Korean Army sometime in the early 1990s.

After the USS Pueblo was captured by the North Koreans in January 1968 the 4th Tactical Fighter Wing deployed to Korea on January 25, 1968. Under the command of Col. Jack Hayes F-4D Phantom IIs arrived at Kunsan on January 29, 1968 as part of Operation Combat Fox. In March Col. Hayes was replaced by Col. Chuck Yeager, the 4th remained in Korea until replaced by the 354th Tactical Fighter Wing. The 354th TFW consisting of the Kansas Air National Guard, the Ohio Air National Guard, (ANG) and a few members of the District of Columbia Air National Guard flying the F-100, arrived at Kunsan in July 1968, as part of the buildup of forces in Korea. In 1969 the wing began a transition from the F-100 to the F-4 Phantom. The 354th remained until June 1970, when the base again returned to hosting temporary deployments, such as the four-month activation of the 54th Tactical Fighter Wing from June through October 1970.

The 3d Tactical Fighter Wing, previously designated the 3d Bombardment Wing, stationed at Kunsan in the early 1950s, arrived in March 1971 to assume control of the base. Like the 354th and 54th, the 3d Tactical Fighter Wing flew the F-4 Phantom. Aircraft came primarily from Misawa AB Japan, 475th Tactical Fighter Wing after it was inactivated and as were most of the personnel initially assigned to the 3rd TFW.  When it first activated in May, the wing contained the 35th, 36th and 80th Tactical Fighter Squadron. In September, the 36th TFS transferred to Osan AB.

In September 1974 the 8th Tactical Fighter Wing, the "Wolf Pack," was transferred from Ubon Air Base, Thailand to replace the 3rd at Kunsan. The move took place in name only, as the 8th moved without personnel or equipment, absorbing all assets of the 3d Tactical Fighter Wing. This included the two flying squadrons, which continued to operate as the 35th and 80th Tactical Fighter Squadrons, reuniting the wing with two of its original squadrons.

Since then, the 8th has continued to serve as host unit of Kunsan Air Base, continually improving the base's facilities over the years.

In February 2018 it was announced that following the completion of construction of hangars and supporting facilities at the base, 12 MQ-1C Gray Eagle UAS' will be deployed to Kunsan in March/April 2018.

Major Commands 
 US Army Pacific Air Command, (1946–47)
 Far East Air Forces, (1947–57)
 Pacific Air Forces, (1957–present)

Base operating units
 27th Fighter-Escort Wing, (April – May 1951)
 931st Engineering Aviation Group (May – August 1951)
 3d Bombardment Wing (August 1951 – September 1954)
 6170th Air Base Group (September 1954 – April 1956)
 6170th Air Base Squadron (April 1956 – March 1959)
 6175th Air Base Group (March 1959 – August 1968)
 354th Tactical Fighter Wing (August 1968 – June 1970)
 6175th Air Base Group (June 1970 – March 1971)
 3d Tactical Fighter Wing (March 1971 – September 1974)
 8th Fighter Wing (September 1974 – present)

Major USAF units assigned
 27th Fighter-Escort Wing (April 1951)
 3d Bombardment Wing (August 1951 – October 1954)
 474th Fighter-Bomber Wing (July 1952 – April 1953)
 49th Fighter-Bomber Wing (April – November 1953)
 354th Tactical Fighter Wing (July 1968 – June 1970)
 54th Tactical Fighter Wing (June – October 1970)
 3d Tactical Fighter Wing (March 1971 – September 1974)
 8th Fighter Wing (September 1974–present)

Kunsan  has provided support for F-84G Thunderjet, B-26 Invader, F-86 Sabre, RF-100 Super Sabre, RB-57 Canberra, F-100 Super Sabre, F-4 Phantom II, and F-16 Fighting Falcon operations.

Based Units 
Flying and notable non-flying units based at Kunsan Air Base.

Units marked GSU are Geographically Separate Units, which although based at Kunsan, are subordinate to a parent unit based at another location.

United States Air Force 
 

Pacific Air Forces (PACAF)

Seventh Air Force
8th Fighter Wing
 Headquarters 8th Fighter Wing
8th Operations Group
 8th Operations Support Squadron
35th Fighter Squadron – F-16C/D – Fighting Falcon
80th Fighter Squadron – F-16C/D – Fighting Falcon
 8th Maintenance Group
8th Aircraft Maintenance Squadron
8th Maintenance Squadron
8th Maintenance Operations Squadron
 8th Mission Support Group
8th Civil Engineer Squadron
8th Communications Squadron
8th Force Support Squadron
8th Logistics Readiness Squadron
8th Security Forces Squadron
 8th Medical Group
8th Medical Operations Squadron
8th Medical Support Squadron

Air Mobility Command (AMC)

 United States Air Force Expeditionary Center
 515th Air Mobility Operations Wing
 515th Air Mobility Operations Group
 731st Air Mobility Squadron 
 Operating Location Alpha (GSU)

United States Army 
US Army Pacific (USARPAC)
Eighth Army
 94th Army Air and Missile Defense Command
 35th Air Defense Artillery Brigade
 2nd Battalion, 1st Air Defense Artillery Regiment – MIM-104 Patriot
 65th Medical Brigade
 US Army Medical Materiel Center-Korea
 25th Transportation Battalion

Republic of Korea Air Force 
Air Force Operations Command

 Air Combat Command
 38th Fighter Group
 111th Fighter Squadron (111대대) – F-16C/D and KF-16C/D

See also
 United States Forces Korea
 United States Pacific Air Forces

References

 

 USAAS-USAAC-USAAF-USAF Aircraft Serial Numbers—1908 to present
 Some of the text in this article was taken from pages on the Kunsan Air Base website, which as a work of the U.S. Government is presumed to be a public domain resource.   That information was supplemented by:
 Endicott, Judy G. (1999) Active Air Force wings as of 1 October 1995; USAF active flying, space, and missile squadrons as of 1 October 1995. Maxwell AFB, Alabama: Office of Air Force History. CD-ROM.
 Fletcher, Harry R. (1989) Air Force Bases Volume II, Active Air Force Bases outside the United States of America on 17 September 1982. Maxwell AFB, Alabama: Office of Air Force History. 
 Maurer, Maurer (1983). Air Force Combat Units Of World War II. Maxwell AFB, Alabama: Office of Air Force History. .
 Ravenstein, Charles A. (1984). Air Force Combat Wings Lineage and Honors Histories 1947–1977. Maxwell AFB, Alabama: Office of Air Force History. .
 Rogers, Brian (2005). United States Air Force Unit Designations Since 1978. Hinkley, England: Midland Publications. .
 Thompson, Warren (2000). B-26 Invader Units over Korea. Osprey Publishing 
 Thompson, Warren (2001). F-80 Shooting Star Units over Korea. Osprey Publishing

External links

 Kunsan Air Base, official U.S. Air Force website
 History of Kunsan Air Base
 
 

Installations of the United States Air Force in South Korea
Gunsan
Airports established in 1938
Buildings and structures in North Jeolla Province
Korean War air bases
1938 establishments in Korea